The Citroën C-Airplay is a concept car designed by Citroën and unveiled at the 2005 Bologna Motor Show. The car was also shown at the 2006 British International Motor Show.

Overview
The vehicle is a three-door, four-seater city car with a slightly rounded body shape similar to that of the Fiat 500. A feature of the design was the tinted glass inserted in the lower half of the doors. The car was similar to the Citroën C-Buggy.

References

C-Airplay
2000s cars
City cars
Hatchbacks